pistolswing is the debut studio album by Texas hard rock band johnboy. It was released in 1993 on Trance Syndicate.

Critical reception
Option wrote that the band "writes discreet units of action which are thrown together in unexpected arrangements."

Track listing

Personnel 
johnboy
Tony Bice – bass guitar, vocals, photography
Jason Meade – drums
Barry Stone – guitar, vocals

Production and additional personnel
Aaron Garbutt – photography
Paul Stautinger – engineering
Jerry Tubb – mastering

References

External links 
 

1993 debut albums
Trance Syndicate albums